The following is a timeline of the history of the city of Nuremberg, Germany.

Prior to 15th century

 1030 – Nuremberg Castle built (approximate date).
 1060 – Residence of the burgrave established.
 1127 - Emperor Lothair assigns Nuremberg to Henry the Proud.
 1140 – Monastery of St. Egidius founded.
 1219 – Nuremberg becomes a Free Imperial City.
 1298 – St. Lawrence church built.
 1349 – Craftsmen's uprising.
 1361 – Frauenkirche (church) built.
 1377 – Luginsland Tower construction begins in Nuremberg Castle.
 1380 – Nuremberg Charterhouse (monastery) founded.
 1382 – Playing cards in use (approximate date).
 1390 - Paper mill established by Stromer near city.
 1397 - Population: 5,626.

15th–16th centuries

 1424 – Imperial Regalia of the Holy Roman Empire relocated to Nuremberg.
 1427 – Ownership of Castle transferred to city.
 1437 – Black Death.
 1445 – Stadtbibliothek (city library) established.
 1470 – Anton Koberger printer in business.
1484 - Reformacion der Stat Nuremberg (legal code) with Jewry Oath published
 1485 - Kuchenmeysterey cookbook published.
 1486 –  (bridge) built.
 1488 - Sigmund Meisterlin writes Nürnberger Chronik, a history of the city.
 1492 – Martin Behaim creates Erdapfel (geographical globe).
 1493 – Schedel's Liber Chronicarum published.
 1495 – Artist Albrecht Dürer sets up workshop.
 1505
 City territory expanded per Landshut War of Succession.
 Clockmaker Peter Henlein active (see Watch 1505)
 1519
 St. Sebaldus Church built.
 Bratwurstglocklein tavern in business (approximate date).
 1525 – Protestant Reformation.
 1526 – Lutheran Melanchthon's Gymnasium opens.
 1532 – City hosts religious Peace of Nuremberg agreement.
 1541 - February: Charles V, Holy Roman Emperor visits city.
 1550 - St. Martha church in use as a theatre space by meistersinger Sachs.
 1561 – April: Celestial phenomenon over Nuremberg.
 1573 - Wenzel Jamnitzer a distinguished goldsmith represented the Goldsmiths on the Nuremberg city council.
 1583 -  built.
 1598 – Fleisch Bridge built over Pegnitz.

17th–18th centuries

 1619 –  (town hall) rebuilt.
 1632 – Siege of Nuremberg. 
 1662 – Academy of Fine Arts established.
 1668 – Simplicissimus (novel) published.
 1695 – Pachelbel becomes organist of St. Sebaldus Church.
 1718 – St. Egidien Church rebuilt.
 1728 –  (bridge) built.
 1750 - Population: 30,000.
 1792 – Kunstverein Nürnberg (art association) founded.

19th century
 1806 – City becomes part of the Kingdom of Bavaria, per Treaty of Confederation of the Rhine.
 1810
 Catholic parish established.
 Population: 28,544.
 1817 – City becomes part of the Bavarian Rezatkreis district.
 1818 - Population: 27,000. 
 1825 – Gostenhof and  become part of city.
 1833 – New City Theatre built on Lorenzer Platz.
 1835 – Bavarian Ludwigsbahn railway (Fürth-Nuremberg) begins operating.
 1841 –  engineering firm in business.
 1844 – Nürnberg Hauptbahnhof opens.
 1852
 German Museum established.
 Population: 53,638.
 1859 – Nuremberg–Schwandorf railway begins operating.
 1861 - Population: 62,797.
 1868 – Bayerisches Gewerbemuseum (museum) founded.
 1871 – Albrecht Dürer's House museum established.
 1875 - Population: 91,018.
 1878 – Verein fur Geschichte der Stadt (city history society) active.
 1882 – Numismatic Society founded.
 1883 – Nuremberg–Cheb railway in operation.
 1885 – Schuckert & Co. engineering firm in business.
 1889 – Verein von Freunden der Photographie (photo group) founded.

 1899
 Nuremberg Photography Society founded.
 Railway museum opens.
 1900
 's Intimes Theater opens.
 Population: 261,081.

20th century

 1905
 New Staatstheater Nürnberg inaugurated.
 Population: 294,344.
 1912 – Nuremberg Zoo opens.
 1916 – Palace of Justice built.
 1927 – August: 3rd Nazi Party Congress held.
 1928 – Frankenstadion (stadium) opens.
 1929 – August: 4th Nazi Party Congress held.
 1930 - Population: 416,700.
 1933 – 30 August-3 September: 5th Nazi Party Congress held; Riefenstahl's Der Sieg des Glaubens filmed.

 1934
 July: 4th Deutsche Kampfspiele (athletic event) held in Frankenstadion.
 September: 6th Nazi Party Congress held; Riefenstahl's Triumph of the Will filmed.
 1937 – Deutsches Stadion construction begins (never completed).
 1938 – Expulsion of Polish Jews.
 1939 – Internment camp for civilian prisoners established (future Stalag XIII-D POW camp).
 1941 – Forced labour camp established at the SS barracks.
 1942 – Russenwiese forced labour camp established.
 1943
 15 July: Forced labour camp at the SS barracks converted into a subcamp of the Flossenbürg concentration camp.
 August: Russenwiese forced labour camp dissolved.
 1944 – Subcamp of Flossenbürg for women established at the Siemens-Schuckertwerke factory.
 1945
 March: Siemens-Schuckertwerke subcamp of Flossenbürg dissolved. Prisoners sent to subcamps in Holýšov and Mehltheuer.
 April: SS barracks subcamp of Flossenbürg dissolved. Prisoners sent to the Dachau concentration camp.
 16–20 April: Battle of Nuremberg.
 October: Nürnberger Nachrichten newspaper begins publication.
 20 November: International Military Tribunal against Nazi leaders begins.
 1946
 9 December: Nuremberg Military Tribunals against Nazi leaders begin.
 Franconia State Orchestra formed.
 1948 — A “strong tornado” destroys dozens of homes and kills 11 people in the city.
 1950
 German Toy Fair begins.
 Population: 362,459.
 1957 – Langwasser development begins.
 1959 – St. Egidien Church rebuilt.
 1967 – Kunsthalle Nürnberg (art centre) founded.
 1968 – City mapped into 10 Statistischen Stadtteilen (statistical districts).
 1971 – Nuremberg Toy Museum founded.
 1972 – Katzwang becomes part of city.
 1987 – Nuremberg S-Bahn S1 metro railway begins operating.
 1992 – Nuremberg S-Bahn S2 and S3 metro railway begins operating.
 2000 – Neues Museum Nürnberg opens.

21st century
 2001 – City co-hosts the 2001 IIHF World Championship.
 2002 – Ulrich Maly becomes mayor.
 2010 – Nuremberg S-Bahn S4 metro railway begins operating.
 2012 – Population: 495,121.

See also
 
 List of mayors of Nuremberg
 Free Imperial City of Nuremberg, 1219-1806
 
 Art and architecture of Nuremberg (in German)
 Timelines of other cities in the state of Bavaria: Augsburg, Munich, Würzburg

References

This article incorporates information from the Dutch Wikipedia and German Wikipedia.

Bibliography

in English
Published in the 18th-19th century
 
 
 
 
 
 
 
 
 
 
 
 
 
 
 
 

Published in the 20th century
  (1863 ed.)
 
 
 
 
  
 
 
 
 
 

Published in the 21st century

in German

External links

 Links to fulltext city directories for Nuremberg via Wikisource
 Europeana. Items related to Nuremberg, various dates.

 
Nuremberg
Nuremberg-related lists